The Connaught is a five-star luxury hotel, located on the corner of Carlos Place and Mount Street in Mayfair, London. The hotel is owned and managed by Maybourne Hotel Group.

History
The hotel first opened in 1815 as the Prince of Saxe Coburg Hotel, an offshoot of a hotel opened by Alexander Grillon in Albemarle Street, Mayfair, and was originally a pair of Georgian houses in Charles Street, near Grosvenor Square. The 1st Duke of Westminster decided to redevelop the area, and the street was changed, becoming Carlos Place. In 1892 Scorrier, the owner, applied to rebuild the hotel, although work did not start until two years later, when the original houses were demolished.

In 1897, the Coburg Hotel was reopened. In 1917, during the First World War, the decision was made to change the name to the less-German "Connaught". The name chosen was taken from the title of Queen Victoria's third son, Prince Arthur, the first Duke of Connaught.

In 1935, Rudolph Richard, a young Swiss hotelier, became general manager of The Connaught and ran the hotel almost as an English private house, with the highest standards of comfort and service. In 1956, The Connaught was acquired by the Savoy Group, owners of Claridge's, The Berkeley and the Savoy Hotel in London. In 2005, the Savoy Group, including The Connaught, was sold to a group of Irish investors, which sold off the Savoy Hotel and Savoy Theatre and renamed the group Maybourne Hotel Group.

Restoration
In March 2007, The Connaught closed for a £70 million restoration programme, described as a "contemporary interpretation". Guy Oliver was the lead designer of the restoration, refurbishment and redecoration of the old hotel, completing a total of 88 rooms and suites (including The Prince's Lodge, The Eagles Lodge and The Sutherland and Somerset Suites) as well as the restoration and redecoration of the main staircase, new lifts, concierge and public areas, L'Espelette Restaurant and The Georgian and Regency Rooms. Immediately after this work was completed he designed a further 31 rooms and suites in the new addition to the hotel, a terrace penthouse, and all of the public spaces and function rooms, including the Ballroom, Maple Oak and Silver Rooms. The Maybourne Hotel Group stated that they intended to preserve the traditional values for which the hotel is known. Chef Angela Hartnett was replaced by French chef Hélène Darroze.

The hotel reopened in December 2007 with fewer rooms than usually available; development continued throughout 2008 when The Connaught Bar, designed by David Collins, opened. The hotel also has a swimming pool and Asian-inspired spa managed in conjunction with Aman Resorts. Other changes include a new Espelette Restaurant, with a covered terrace, and the Coburg Bar, managed by Andreas Cortes. The Connaught Bar is run by mixologist Agostino Perrone, which has received several international awards including World's Best Cocktail Bar at the coveted Tales of the Cocktail Spirited Awards in both 2012 and 2016, the only bar in the world to have won it twice.

Notable guests
The Connaught has hosted guests such as Edward VII, Charles de Gaulle, U.S. Admiral Alan G. Kirk, Princess Grace of Monaco, Cecil Beaton, Cary Grant, David Niven, Lauren Bacall, Eric Clapton, Jack Nicholson and Ralph Lauren. The hotel was a particular favourite of actor Sir Alec Guinness, who from the 1970s until shortly before his death in 2000 would often stay at the Connaught when working in London. A suite was always at his disposal and he would often entertain friends in the Grill or in a private dining room.

References

External links 
 The Connaught website
 Architect's summary of recent work
 A history of The Connaught by cosmopolis.ch
 French-Indian interior architect India Mahdavi designed major parts of the hotel

Hotel buildings completed in 1815
Hotel buildings completed in 1897
Hotels in the City of Westminster
Hotels established in 1837
Mayfair